"Girl from Sweden"  is a song by Swedish singer Eric Saade. The song was released as a digital download on 22 May 2015 through Roxy Recordings. The song did not enter the Swedish Singles Chart, but peaked at number 1 on the Swedish Heatseeker Chart.

Music video
A video to accompany the release of "Girl from Sweden" was first released onto YouTube on 22 May 2015 at a total length of three minutes and fifty-six seconds.

Track listing

Charts

Release history

References

2015 songs
2015 singles
Eric Saade songs
Songs written by Eric Saade